Gramatikovo is a village in Malko Tarnovo Municipality, in Burgas Province, in southeastern Bulgaria. It is situated in Strandzha Nature Park.

On 31 January 2011 a foot-and-mouth disease outbreak was discovered in the village of Gramatikovo.

References

Villages in Burgas Province